Trevor Demetrius Ford (born February 19, 1986) is a former American football cornerback. He was signed by the Green Bay Packers as an undrafted free agent in 2009. He played college football at Troy.

External links
Just Sports Stats
http://toytrojans.com/roster.aspx?rp_id=155&path=football
http://rivals.yahoo.com/.../football/recruiting/player-Trevor-Ford-20890
http://espn.go.com/nfl/player/stats/_/id/13052/trevor-fordhsflorida.scout.com/3/2004_ATLANTIC_COAST_CONFERENCE.html

1986 births
Living people
Miami Northwestern Senior High School alumni
Players of American football from Miami
American football cornerbacks
Troy Trojans football players
Green Bay Packers players
Arizona Cardinals players
Hartford Colonials players